Deshawn Freeman (born January 1, 1994) is an American basketball player for BK Patrioti Levice of the Slovak Basketball League. He played three seasons of college basketball for Rutgers seasons before turning professionally in 2018.

Career
After three seasons with Rutgers, Freeman signed with the Worcester Wolves on October 11, 2018. He was the leading scorer for the Wolves in the British Basketball League (BBL), averaging 17.9 points per game along with 9.7 rebounds in 19 games.

On August 7, 2019, Freeman signed a one-year contract with Donar of the Dutch Basketball League (DBL). He left the team in November 2019 after averaging 5.3 points over 9 games.

He continued his season with Södertälje Kings in Sweden, where he averaged 11.6 points per game in 9 games. The season was ended early due to the COVID-19 pandemic.

On August 14, 2021, Freeman signed with BK Patrioti Levice of the Slovak Basketball League.

References

1994 births
Living people
Worcester Wolves players
American expatriate basketball people in the United Kingdom
American expatriate basketball people in the Netherlands
American expatriate basketball people in Sweden
Power forwards (basketball)
Small forwards
Rutgers Scarlet Knights men's basketball players
Donar (basketball club) players
Dutch Basketball League players
Södertälje Kings players